Authority for Info-communications Technology Industry (AITI) is an independent commission in Brunei founded under the Telecommunications Order, 2001 (S 38/01) in 2001. AITI is responsible for regulating all matters related to telecommunications (wire, cellular, satellite and cable) of Brunei.

History 
AITI was established in 2003 by the Government of Brunei when the Telecommunications Order of 2001. They agency has started plans to implement 5G in Brunei starting in 2021 and this will be managed by National 5G Taskforce.

Mandate and purpose 
The following legislation prescribes the powers and functions of AITI

 Telecommunications Order, 2001 (S 38/01)

Core purposes 
Further core purposes of AITI are:

 Setting industry standards
 Setting tariffs and appropriate guidelines
 Acting as responsible, accountable referee in industry to facilitate
 Investment and universal service
 Facilitating and promoting an environment that ensures protection of end-users
 To ensure compliance with the communication service regulatory framework through the management and monitoring of broadcast content and terms and licence conditions
 To research communications regulation, best practice communications services and industry performance so as to advise government on policy formulation
 Establish communications regulatory policies
 Inform industry and consumers
 To promote and encourage efficient communication services so as to attract investment
 To promote capacity building within communications industry
 To represent Brunei's interests in the international communications arena

See also 

 List of telecommunications regulatory bodies
 Malaysian Communications and Multimedia Commission
 Ministry of Communication and Information Technology (Indonesia)

References

External links 

 

Communications authorities
Telecommunications regulatory authorities
Government agencies of Brunei